The schedule of 11 public holidays in Singapore which are gazetted and recognized since the establishment of Singapore's 1999 Holidays Act.

List of public holidays in Singapore 
There are generally 11 public holidays a year; however, since the gap between the Islamic calendar and the Gregorian calendar last around 11.5 months, Hari Raya Aidil Fitri and Hari Raya Aidil Adha are respectively celebrated twice in a Gregorian calendar year every 32 or 33 years, as this occurred in 1968 and 2000 for Hari Raya Puasa as well as 1974 and 2006 for Hari Raya Haji, giving Singaporeans 12 public holidays in those years.

The list of all the holidays are as follows (listed in alphabetical order):

Under the Holiday's Act, should a Public Holiday falls on a Sunday, the following day on Monday would be gazetted as a public holiday (also called holiday-in-lieu). There are however, special occasions, that may be gazetted by the President of Singapore to declare any day to be observed as a public holiday by modifying any days specified in the schedule to the Holidays' Act and if any, another day to be observed as an additional public holiday when in that year two public holidays fall on the same day. One such occasion occurred during the 2015's National Day, whereas an additional day of August 7 was gazetted as a public holiday in addition to August 10 being the holiday-in-lieu.

If any public holiday falls on a Saturday in Singapore, the following Monday is declared as a school holiday for students in primary & secondary schools, only if that Monday is not a public holiday itself.

2023 Public Holidays and Long Weekends in Singapore

School Holidays

School Holidays are special holidays for students of Singapore as gazetted by the Ministry of Education. Holiday periods varies across schools (Primary, Secondary, Institute of Technical Education, Polytechnics, Junior Colleges and Universities).

Each academic year is divided into two academic semesters of two terms each, with the end of term beginning a school holiday period, and the end of the holiday period marks the start of a fresh academic term. A post-semestral break is usually longer than those of a mid-semestral break. The fourth and final academic term usually begin after the end of the semestral examination, such as the GCE Ordinary Level.

Unlike Public Holidays, school holidays are not gazetted under the Holiday's act, and while also not actual public holidays, Youth Day (first Sunday of July), Teacher's Day (first Friday of September) and Children's Day (first Friday of October; applicable for Primary schools) are also gazetted as school holidays.

General / Presidential Elections 
Under Section 35 of the Parliamentary Elections Act and Section 17 of the Presidential Elections Act, Polling Day for a general election or a presidential election (but not By-elections) is a public holiday that is gazetted by the Returning Officer from the Elections Department Singapore. Under the Employment Act, employees not required to work on that day are entitled to one day off in lieu or be given one day's pay.

Defunct public holidays

Up to and including 1968, these few were also gazetted as public holidays but were removed to improve business competitiveness.

 Boxing Day - Boxing Day is a holiday celebrated the day after Christmas Day.
 Easter Monday - Easter Monday in the Western Christian liturgical calendar is the second day of Eastertide and analogously in the Byzantine Rite is the second day of Bright Week.
 Holy Saturday - Holy Saturday, the Saturday of Holy Week, also known as the Great Sabbath, Black Saturday, or Easter Eve, and called "Joyous Saturday" or "the Saturday of Light" among Coptic Christians, is the day after Good Friday.
 Thaipusam - A Hindu festival celebrated mostly by the Tamil community on the full moon in the Tamil month of Thai.
 Birthday of Prophet Mohamed - The observance of the birthday of the Islamic prophet Muhammad which is celebrated in Rabi' al-awwal, the third month in the Islamic calendar.
 Second day of Hari Raya Puasa - Second day of Hari Raya

Workers' rights 
It is legal for employers to agree to give their employees other holidays in substitution for one or more public holidays. No act or thing relating to any government department or public authority, any judicial proceeding, any transaction, instrument or any other act or thing is rendered invalid where it is done or executed on a Sunday or public holiday.

Under the Employment Act, an employee who is required to work on a public holiday is entitled to an extra day's salary at the basic rate of pay, in addition to the gross rate of pay for that holiday.

The days observed as general public holidays in Singapore are declared in the schedule to the Holidays Act. According to the Ministry of Manpower, which issues a yearly list of the dates on which public holidays fall, the holidays were "chosen and agreed upon after close consultation with different community and religious leaders in Singapore". Other factors taken into account were the impact on business costs and statutory leave provided for under the Employment Act. Thus, some religious holidays such as Easter Monday, Mawlid (the birthday of the Prophet Muhammad), Boxing Day and Thaipusam were removed from the list of public holidays to improve business competitiveness.

References

 
Singapore
Singaporean culture
Events in Singapore
Holidays